Erin Wiedner (born in Mill Valley, California) is an American independent filmmaker, director and cinematographer.

Early life
Little is publicly known about Erin's early life. What is known is that Erin was born in Mill Valley, California.

Music videos
Erin has been the Director and Cinematographer for various music videos. The videos have been seen by a wide audience. Once such music video for the single, "How Can I Let You Go," performed by Filipino actress, and musical artist, Patricia Javier from her album "Songs From My Heart" was shown on MTV Philippines.

Commercials
Erin has been the Director and Cinematographer for a multitude of commercials, which have been shown on MTV, VH1 and Comedy Central, for various companies in different industries ranging from regional restaurants to night-life and entertainment companies.

Notable Works

Directing

Music videos

Cinematography

Films

Music videos

Frequent collaborators

Directors/Producers
Cecile Cinco

Actors/Actresses
Erin has worked with Joseph Will, who has had roles on Star Trek: Voyager and Star Trek: Enterprise, as well as starred with David Hyde Pierce in The Perfect Host, on multiple projects.

Erin has worked with Filipino film star and musical artist Patricia Javier, who has over starred in over 20 films and has released multiple musical albums, in multiple projects, ranging from music videos to films.

Musicians
Patricia Javier
Ava Johnson

Personal life
Erin currently resides in San Diego, California

References

External links
 
 

American music video directors
Film directors from California
Living people
People from Mill Valley, California
Year of birth missing (living people)